José María Pinilla Fábrega (November 28, 1919 – August 10, 1979) was Chairman of the Provisional Junta of Panama from October 12, 1968 to December 18, 1969.

References

1919 births
1979 deaths
Presidents of Panama
Leaders who took power by coup